Tim Dunn (born 26 March 1981) is a British railway historian, TV presenter, geographer and travel editor. Dunn is known for his presenting and writing work, primarily on rail transport and architecture. He also works as a travel editor for transport website Trainline.

Personal life 
Dunn grew up in Chalfont St Peter, Buckinghamshire and was introduced to railways at an early age by his grandparents and worked at the local Bekonscot model village as a teenager. He trained as a historical geographer, and in addition to broadcasting he has curated museum exhibitions, has been a museum trustee, and is on the advisory panel of the UK's Railway Heritage Trust. He currently lives in London with his boyfriend, an architectural historian.

Filmography

Published works
Dunn is a contributor on railways and architecture to a number of publications such as RAIL, The Railway Magazine and Londonist, and has also published some standalone works.

References

External links
 
 

1981 births
living people
English television presenters
Rail transport writers
Alumni of the University of Exeter
Alumni of the University of Warwick
Gay men
British LGBT broadcasters
LGBT historians
English LGBT writers